In mathematics, the lemniscate elliptic functions are elliptic functions related to the arc length of the lemniscate of Bernoulli. They were first studied by Giulio Fagnano in 1718 and later by Leonhard Euler and Carl Friedrich Gauss, among others.

While the trigonometric sine relates the arc length to the  chord length in a unit-diameter circle  the lemniscate sine relates the arc length to the chord length of a lemniscate 

The lemniscate functions have periods related to a number  called the lemniscate constant, the ratio of a lemniscate's perimeter to its diameter. This number is a quartic analog of the (quadratic) , ratio of perimeter to diameter of a circle.

As complex functions,  and  have a square period lattice (a multiple of the Gaussian integers) with fundamental periods  and are a special case of two Jacobi elliptic functions on that lattice,  .

Similarly, the hyperbolic lemniscate sine  and hyperbolic lemniscate cosine  have a square period lattice with fundamental periods 

The lemniscate functions and the hyperbolic lemniscate functions are related to the Weierstrass elliptic function .

Lemniscate sine and cosine functions

Definitions
The lemniscate functions  and  can be defined as the solution to the initial value problem:

or equivalently as the inverses of an elliptic integral, the Schwarz–Christoffel map from the complex unit disk to a square with corners 

Beyond that square, the functions can be analytically continued to the whole complex plane by a series of reflections.

By comparison, the circular sine and cosine can be defined as the solution to the initial value problem:

Arc length of Bernoulli's lemniscate

This is a quartic curve satisfying the polar equation  or the Cartesian equation 

The points on the lemniscate at distance  from the origin are the intersections of the circle  and the hyperbola . The intersection in the positive quadrant has Cartesian coordinates:

Or in the inverse direction, the lemniscate sine and cosine functions give the distance from the origin as functions of arc length from the origin and the point , respectively.

Analogously, the circular sine and cosine functions relate the chord length to the arc length for the unit diameter circle with polar equation  or Cartesian equation  using the same argument above but with the parametrization:

Alternatively, just as the unit circle  is parametrized in terms of the arc length  from the point  by

the lemniscate is parametrized in terms of the arc length  from the point  by

The lemniscate integral and lemniscate functions satisfy an argument duplication identity discovered by Fagnano in 1718:

Later mathematicians generalized this result. Analogously to the constructible polygons in the circle, the lemniscate can be divided into  sections of equal arc length using only straightedge and compass if and only if  is of the form  where  is a non-negative integer and each  (if any) is a distinct Fermat prime. The "if" part of the theorem was proved by Niels Abel in 1827–1828, and the "only if" part was proved by Michael Rosen in 1981. Equivalently, the lemniscate can be divided into  sections of equal arc length using only straightedge and compass if and only if  is a power of two (where  is Euler's totient function). The lemniscate is not assumed to be already drawn; the theorem refers to constructing the division points only.

Let . Then the -division points for the lemniscate  are the points

where  is the floor function.

Arc length of rectangular elastica 

The inverse lemniscate sine also describes the arc length  relative to the  coordinate of the rectangular elastica. This curve has  coordinate and arc length:

The rectangular elastica solves a problem posed by Jacob Bernoulli, in 1691, to describe the shape of an idealized flexible rod fixed in a vertical orientation at the bottom end and pulled down by a weight from the far end until it has been bent horizontal. Bernoulli's proposed solution established Euler–Bernoulli beam theory, further developed by Euler in the 18th century.

Elliptic characterization

The parameter  is given by

Relation to the lemniscate constant 

The lemniscate functions satisfy the basic relation  analogous to the relation 

The lemniscate constant  is a close analog of the circle constant , and many identities involving  have analogues involving , as identities involving the trigonometric functions have analogues involving the lemniscate functions. For example, Viète's formula for  can be written:

Euler's formula .

The lemniscate and circle constants were found by Gauss to be related to each-other by the arithmetic-geometric mean :

Zeros, poles and symmetries 

Elliptic functions with a square period lattice are more symmetrical than arbitrary elliptic functions, following the symmetries of the square.

Reflections and quarter-turn rotations of lemniscate function arguments have simple expressions:

The  function is reflected and offset from the  function, . It has zeros for arguments  and poles for arguments  with residues 

Also

The last formula is a special case of complex multiplication.

There are also infinite series reflecting the distribution of the zeros and poles of :

The lemniscate sine as a ratio of entire functions 

Since the lemniscate sine is a meromorphic function in the whole complex plane, it can be written as a ratio of entire functions. Gauss showed that  has the following product expansion, reflecting the distribution of its zeros and poles:

where

Gauss conjectured that  (this later turned out to be true) and commented that this “is most remarkable and a proof of this property promises the most serious increase in analysis”.

and

Pythagorean-like identity 

The lemniscate functions satisfy a Pythagorean-like identity:

As a result, the parametric equation  parametrizes the quartic curve 

This identity can alternately be rewritten:

Defining a tangent-sum operator as  gives:

The functions  and  satisfy another Pythagorean-like identity:

Derivatives and integrals 

The derivatives are as follows:

The second derivatives of lemniscate sine and lemniscate cosine are their negative duplicated cubes:

The lemniscate functions can be integrated using the inverse tangent function:

Argument sum and multiple identities 

Like the trigonometric functions, the lemniscate functions satisfy argument sum and difference identities. The original identity used by Fagnano for bisection of the lemniscate was:

 

Defining a tangent-sum operator  and tangent-difference operator  the argument sum and difference identities can be expressed as:

These resemble their trigonometric analogs:

In particular, to compute the complex-valued functions in real components,

Bisection formulas:

Duplication formulas:

Triplication formulas:

Lemnatomic polynomials

Let  be the lattice

Then

for some coprime polynomials 
and some  where

and

where  is any -torsion generator (i.e.  and  generates  as an -module). The polynomial  is called the -th lemnatomic polynomial. The lemnatomic polynomials are the "lemniscate analogs" of the cyclotomic polynomials,

and

(an equivalent expression is given in the table below). Another example is

which can be compared to the cyclotomic analog

Specific values

Just as for the trigonometric functions, values of the lemniscate functions can be computed for divisions of the lemniscate into  parts of equal length, using only basic arithmetic and square roots, if and only if  is of the form  where  is a non-negative integer and each  (if any) is a distinct Fermat prime. The expressions become unwieldy as  grows.

Power series 

The power series expansion of the lemniscate sine at the origin is

where the coefficients  are determined as follows:

The expansion can be equivalently written as

where

where  if  is even and

if  is odd.

The expansion can be equivalently written as

where

For the lemniscate cosine,

where

Relation to Weierstrass and Jacobi elliptic functions 

The associated constants of the Weierstrass function are 

However, this may involve complex numbers. The period parallelogram is either a square or a rhombus. The Weierstrass elliptic function  is called the "pseudolemniscatic case".

The square of the lemniscate sine can be represented as

Another representation is

where the second argument of  denotes the period ratio . The lemniscate sine is a rational function in the Weierstrass elliptic function and its derivative:

In terms of the period ratio , this becomes

The lemniscate functions can also be written in terms of Jacobi elliptic functions.

where the second arguments denote the elliptic modulus .

where the second argument of  denotes the elliptic modulus .

The functions  and  can also be expressed in terms of Jacobi elliptic functions:

Relation to the modular lambda function 

The lemniscate sine can be used for the computation of values of the modular lambda function:

For example:

Ramanujan's cos/cosh identity
Ramanujan's famous cos/cosh identity states that if

then

Indeed,

and

Continued fractions
For :

Methods of computation 

Several methods of computing  involve first making the change of variables  and then computing 

A hyperbolic series method:

Fourier series method:

The lemniscate functions can be computed more rapidly by

where

are the Jacobi theta functions.

Two other fast computation methods use the following sum and product series:

where 

Fourier series for the logarithm of the lemniscate sine:

The following series identities were discovered by Ramanujan:

Inverse functions
The inverse function of the lemniscate sine is the lemniscate arcsine, defined as

It can also be represented by the hypergeometric function:

The inverse function of the lemniscate cosine is the lemniscate arccosine. This function is defined by following expression:

For  in the interval ,  and 

For the halving of the lemniscate arc length these formulas are valid:

Expression using elliptic integrals 

The lemniscate arcsine and the lemniscate arccosine can also be expressed by the Legendre-Form:

These functions can be displayed directly by using the incomplete elliptic integral of the first kind:

The arc lengths of the lemniscate can also be expressed by only using the arc lengths of ellipses (calculated by elliptic integrals of the second kind):

The lemniscate arccosine has this expression:

Use in integration 

The lemniscate arcsine can be used to integrate many functions. Here is a list of important integrals (the constants of integration are omitted):

Hyperbolic lemniscate functions 

The hyperbolic lemniscate sine and cosine can be defined as inverses of elliptic integrals as follows:

Beyond that square, the functions can be analytically continued to meromorphic functions in the whole complex plane.

The complete integral has the value:

Therefore, the two defined functions have following relation to each other:

The product of hyperbolic lemniscate sine and hyperbolic lemniscate cosine is equal to one:

The functions  and  have a square period lattice with fundamental periods .

The hyperbolic lemniscate functions can be expressed in terms of lemniscate sine and lemniscate cosine:

But there is also a relation to the Jacobi elliptic functions with the elliptic modulus one by square root of two:

The hyperbolic lemniscate sine has following imaginary relation to the lemniscate sine:

This is analogous to the relationship between hyperbolic and trigonometric sine:

In a quartic Fermat curve  (sometimes called a squircle) the hyperbolic lemniscate sine and cosine are analogous to the tangent and cotangent functions in a unit circle  (the quadratic Fermat curve). Moreover,

where  is the arithmetic–geometric mean.

The hyperbolic lemniscate sine satisfies the argument addition identity:

When  is real, the derivative can be expressed in this way:

Number theory 

Both are special cases of Kronecker's Jugendtraum, which became Hilbert's twelfth problem.

The field  (for positive odd ) is the extension of  generated by the - and -coordinates of the -torsion points on the elliptic curve .

Hurwitz numbers
The Bernoulli numbers  can be defined by

and appear in

where  is the Riemann zeta function.

The Hurwitz numbers  named after Adolf Hurwitz, are the "lemniscate analogs" of the Bernoulli numbers. They can be defined by

They appear in

The Hurwitz numbers can also be determined as follows: ,

This yields

Also

where  such that 
just as

where  (by the von Staudt–Clausen theorem).

In fact, the von Staudt–Clausen theorem states that

Then for any given ,  is uniquely determined and

The sequence of the integers  starts with 

Let . If  is a prime, then . If  is not a prime, then .

Appearances in Laurent series
The Hurwitz numbers appear in several Laurent series expansions related to the lemniscate functions:

Analogously, in terms of the Bernoulli numbers:

World map projections 

The Peirce quincuncial projection, designed by Charles Sanders Peirce of the US Coast Survey in the 1870s, is a world map projection based on the inverse lemniscate sine of stereographically projected points (treated as complex numbers).

When lines of constant real or imaginary part are projected onto the complex plane via the hyperbolic lemniscate sine, and thence stereographically projected onto the sphere (see Riemann sphere), the resulting curves are spherical conics, the spherical analog of planar ellipses and hyperbolas. Thus the lemniscate functions (and more generally, the Jacobi elliptic functions) provide a parametrization for spherical conics.

A conformal map projection from the globe onto the 6 square faces of a cube can also be defined using the lemniscate functions. Because many partial differential equations can be effectively solved by conformal mapping, this map from sphere to cube is convenient for atmospheric modeling.

See also
 Elliptic function
 Abel elliptic functions
 Dixon elliptic functions
 Jacobi elliptic functions
 Weierstrass elliptic function
 Elliptic Gauss sum
 Gauss's constant
 Peirce quincuncial projection
 Schwarz–Christoffel mapping

Notes

External links

References 

 
 
 
 
 
 
 
 
 
 
 
 
  E252. (Figures)
  E 605.
 
 
 
 
 
 
 
 
 
 
 
 
 
 
 
 
 
 
 

 
 
 
 
 
 
 
 
 
 
 
 
 
 
 
 
 
  
 
 
 
 
 
 
 

Modular forms
Elliptic functions